Bhairavi Goswami is an Indian actress, television host.

Early life
Bhairavi was born to parents of mixed heritage. Her father is part Bengali while her mother is Creole. Bhairavi left India at the age of 6 and returned as a teenager to pursue a career in modelling and acting, spending most of her adolescence in the United Kingdom.

Career

Modelling
Bhairavi won the "Pantaloons Model Quest" and was runner up at the "AXN Hot & Wild" contest. The Times of India described her as "the Paris Hilton of India, who loves to socialise".

Movies and theatre
After her first movie role in Sagar Bellary's Bheja Fry, she acted in the children's hit composite animation film My Friend Ganesha 2. In her next film, Mr. Bhatti on Chutti, starring Anupam Kher with Amitabh Bachchan in a cameo appearance, she played a glamorous girl. Bhairavi shed her glamorous image to play a simple school teacher in Kachcha Limboo.
 She has ten plays to her credit, including Liar Liar, Tea Coffee or Me, Mad House and See no Evil, Hear no Evil, Speak no Evil

Music videos
 "Samundar Mein Nahake" remix directed by Samir Malkan
 Raaghav Sachar's first album directed by Indrajit Nattoji for HMV
 "Raat Taakli"", Marathi music video directed by Deepali Vichare

Television credits
 JBC with Javed Jaffery
 Bollywood Live (Indonesia)
 Guest VJ on B4U
 Appeared on Movers & Shakers (Shekhar Suman Show)

Filmography

Theatre

See also
List of Indian film actresses

References

External links
 Official website
 
 

Indian film actresses
Actresses in Hindi cinema
Indian stage actresses
Living people
Year of birth missing (living people)